Gedi or GEDI may refer to:

People 
 Ali Mohamed Gedi (born 1952), Prime Minister of Somalia, 2004–2007
 Bashir Nur Gedi (died 2007), Somalian dissident journalist who was murdered
 Ahmed Jimale Gedi, Somalian Chief of Army, 2010–2011
 Mohamed Omar Gedi, Somalian vice minister in the Cabinet of Somalia
 Gedi Sibony, American artist who exhibited in the 2006 Whitney Biennial
 Gedi Ugas Madhar, Somalian leader of a faction of the Somali Patriotic Movement
 Gedi, a subtribe of the Daizangi (Hazara tribe) in Afghanistan

Places 
 Gedi, Saurashtra, a village on the Saurashtra Peninsula, Gujarat, India
 Gedi State, a former princely state with seat in the above town
 Gedi, Kutch, a village in Kutch district, Gujarat, India
 Gedi, Kenya, a town in Kilifi County, Kenya
 Gedi Ruins, a historical and archaeological site adjacent to the town
 Gedi Township, in Yonghe County, Linfen, Shanxi Province, China
 Gedi, a rural village in Changshan County, Quzhou, Zhejiang Province, China

Other 
 GEDI, Global Ecosystem Dynamics Investigation, a NASA mission to measure the world's forests
 Gedi (mythology), a Fijian god
 Global Entrepreneurship and Development Institute (GEDI), compiler of the Global Entrepreneurship Index
 GEDI Gruppo Editoriale, an Italian media conglomerate

See also 
 Gedi & Sons FC, a Liberian football club
 Gede (disambiguation) 
 Ein Gedi (disambiguation)